Sigismond Thalberg was a virtuoso pianist and prolific composer of the 19th Century. In his time, he was regarded as a pianist equal in footing to the other two great names of the time, Franz Liszt and Frédéric Chopin.

Works with opus numbers

Op. 1 Fantaisie et Variations sur des différens Motifs de l’opéra Euryanthe de C. M. v. Weber.
Op. 2 Fantaisie et Variations sur un thême ecossais.
Op. 3 Impromptu sur des thèmes favoris de l’Opéra Le Siège de Corinth de Rossini.
Op. 4 Douze Valses.
Op. 5 Hommage à Rossini, Motifs de l’opéra Guillaume Tell varié.
Op. 5 Grand concerto pour piano et orchestre.
Op. 6 Fantaisie pour le Piano-Forte sur des motifs favoris de l’Opéra Robert le Diable de Meyerbeer.
Op. 7 Grand divertissement pour pianoforte et cor (ou violoncelle), avec accompagnement d´orchestre.
Op. 8 Sechs Deutsche Lieder, Erstes Heft
[1] Ihre Augen: "Du hast Diamanten und Perlen".
[2] Der Wanderer: "In Windsgeräusch".
[3] Abreise: "Der Mond, der scheinet so bleich".
[4] Fröhliches Scheiden: "Gar fröhlich kann ich scheiden".
[5] Die Nonne: "Im stillen Klostergarten".
[6] Der Reitersmann: "Kaum gedacht, war der Lust ein End gemacht".
Op. 9 Fantaisie sur des motifs de l’Opéra La Straniera de Bellini.
Op. 10 Grande Fantaisie et Variations sur un Motif de l’Opéra de V. Bellini I Montecchi et Capuleti.
Op. 11 Sechs deutsche Lieder, Zweites Heft
[7] Lebe wohl: "Schöne Wiege meiner Leiden".
[8] Der Strom: "Berg und Burgen schauen herunter".
[9] Mitgefühl: "Und wüsstens die Blumen".
[10] Hass und Liebe: "Sie haben mich gequälet".
[11] Die Thräne: "Was will die einsäme Thräne".
[12] Träumen und Wachen: "Ich hatt´im Traum geweinet".
Op.12 Grande Fantaisie et Variations sur des motifs de l’Opéra Norma de Bellini.
 (Also: Op. 12 Grand duo pour deux pianos sur des motifs de «Norma» de Bellini, with Émile Prudent).
Op. 13 Sechs deutsche Lieder, Drittes Heft
[13] Des Jägers Haus: "Hier andem grünen Walde".
[14] Der todte Müller: "Die Sterne über´m Thale".
[15] Sprache der Liebe: "Ich hab´es den Blumen gesagt".
[16] Ein Kamerad: "Einen guten Kameraden fand ich".
[17] Todtengräberlied: "Wie doch so schnell der Mensch vergisst".
[18] Im Dunkeln: "Sie haben heute Abend Gesellschaft".
Op.14 Grande Fantaisie et Variations sur des motifs de l’Opéra Don Juan de Mozart.
Op.15 Caprice.
Op.16 Deux Nocturnes.
Op.17 Deux airs russes variés.
Op.18 Les Soirées musicales de Rossini: Divertissement sur des motifs favoris de Rossini.
Op.19 Deuxième caprice.
Op.20 Fantaisie sur des motifs de l´opéra «Les Huguenots» de Meyerbeer.
Op.21 Trois Nocturnes.
Op.22 Grande fantaisie.
Op.23 Sechs deutsche Lieder, Viertes Heft, Lieder des Einsiedlers
[19] Einsiedlers Blumen / Seine Blumen, "Ihr blühet wohl, liebe Blumen".
[20] Seine Harfe, "O Harfe! Dir hab´ich frühe".
[21] Sein Kreuz, "Sie wanden Dir eine Kron".
[22] Seine Glocken, "Oft wenn ich verzag im Kampfe".
[23] Sein Grab, "Dies Grab hat mir gegraben".
[24] Sein Begräbnis, "Und bin ich dereinst verschieden".
Op. 24 Sechs deutsche Lieder, Fünftes Heft.
[25] Abend: "Lass Kind, lass meinen Weg mich ziehen".
[26] Die Ruinen: "Seht ihr, dort oben am Hügel".
[27] Thränen, No. 1: "Was ist´s, Vater, was ich versprach".
[28] Thränen, No. 2: "Nicht der Thau, Trau und nicht der Regen".
[29] Im Herbst: "Ein kalter Todesschauer".
[30] Segen der Grossmutter: "Traum der eignen Tage".
Op. 25 Sechs deutsche Lieder, Sechstes Heft
[31] An den Frühling: "Was lockst du mich".
[32] Heimlicher Schmerz: "Hast du Schmerzen je getraten".
[33] Erwachen: "Ich schlief wohl eine lange Nacht".
[34] Stille der Nacht: "Die Sterne blicken trübe".
[35] An den Mond: "Wie blickst du feucht und trübe".
[36] Der Ring: "Du Ring am meinem Finger".
Op. 26 Douze Etudes.
Op. 26a (?) Deux âmes, Mélodie pour piano seul.
Op. 27 God save the King and Rule Britannia, Grande fantaisie,
Op. 28 Nocturne.
Op. 29 Sechs deutsche Lieder, Siebentes Heft
[37] Des Jägermädchens Klage: "Jetzt wohl geht auf öden Wegen".
[38] Der Traum: "Im Traum sah ich die Geliebte".
[39] Der Verlobten: "Wenn deine Hochzeit nahet".
[40] Die Unglückliche: "In Deinen schönen Augen".
[41] Sommernacht: "Schweigend ruh´ ich hier".
[42] Abschied: "In meinem dunkeln Leben".
Op. 30 Sechs deutsche Lieder, Achtes Heft
[43] Nacht: "So schaurig ist die finstere Nacht".
[44] Vor meiner Wiege: "Das also, das ist der enge Schrein".
[45] Der Findling: "Ich habe keinen Vater".
[46] Wanderers Liebesschmerz I: "Es ist für schlimme Augen".
[47] Wanderers Liebesschmerz II: "Ob sie meiner wohl gedenkt".
[48] Warum?: "Warum sind denn die Rosen so blass".
Op. 31 Scherzo.
Op. 32 Andante.
Op. 33 Fantaisie sur des thèmes de l’opéra Moïse de G. Rossini.
Op. 34 Divertissement sur un thème de l’opéra de Jules Benedict „The Gipsy’s Warning“.
Op. 35 Grand nocturne.
Op. 36 Six morceaux
[1] La cadence. Impromptu en forme d´étude.
[2] Etude de perfection.
[3] "Mi manca la voce" de l´opéra «Moïse» de Rossini.
[4] La Romanesca, Fameux air de danse du 16ème siècle.
[5] Canzonette italienne, "Felice donzella" de Dessauer.
[6] Romance sans paroles.
[7] Nocturne, (see also: Op. 51bis).
[8] Deuxième romance, (A catalogue entry only, the work has not yet been identified.).
[9] Valse, "Pauline" de Charles de Saint Robert.
[10] Duo de l´opéra «Der Freischütz» de Weber, (see also: Op. 70b & Op. 70,11).
Op. 37 Fantaisie sur des motifs de l’Opéra Oberon de C.M. de Weber.
Op. 38 Romance et Etude.
Op. 39 Souvenir de Beethoven, Fantaisie.
Op. 40 Fantaisie sur des motifs de La Donna del Lago.
Op. 41 Deux Romances sans Paroles
Op. 42 Grande Fantaisie sur la Sérénade et le Menuet de Don Juan.
Op. 43 Grand duo concertant pour piano et violon sur des motifs de l´opéra Les Huguenots, with Bériot.
Op. 44 Andante final de Lucie de Lammermoor varié.
Op. 45 Thême et Etude.
Op. 46 Grand Caprice sur des motifs de l’Opéra la Sonnambula.
Op. 47 Grandes Valses brillantes.
Op. 48 Grand Caprice sur des motifs de l’opéra Charles VI de Halévy.
Op. 49 Grand Duo sur des motifs de l'opéra de V. Beatrice di Tenda, piano and violin, with Heinrich Panofka.
Op. 50 Fantaisie sur l’opéra Lucrezia Borgia de Donizetti
Op. 51 Grande Fantaisie sur l’opéra Semiramide de Rossini
Op. 51 bis Nocturne.
Op. 52 Fantaisie sur des motifs de l’opéra La Muette de Portici.
Op. 53 Grande fantaisie sur Zampa de F. Herold.
Op. 54 Grand Duo concertant sur La Sémiramide de Rossini, piano and violin, with Bériot.
Op. 55 Le Depart, Romance en forme d´Etude.
Op. 56 Grande sonate.
Op. 57 Decameron, Dix Morceau pour le Piano servant d´Ecole préparatoire à l´Etude de ses Grandes Compositions.
No.1 Fantaisie sur I Puritani.
No.2 Fantaisie sur de thèmes de l´Opéra Der Freischütz.
No.3 Fantaisie sur Le Pré aux Clercs.
No.4 Fantaisie sur Norma.
No.5 Fantaisie sur des mélodies de F. Schubert.
No.6 Fantaisie sur des motifs de l´Opéra La gazza ladra.
No.7 Fantaisie sur l´Opéra Cenerentola de G. Rossini.
No.8 Fantaisie sur des motifs d'Anna Bolena.
No.9 Caprice sur des thèmes de l´Opéra Le Prophète de G. Meyerbeer.
No.10 Airs irlandais variés.
Op. 58 Grand Caprice sur la marche de l'Apothéose de Berlioz.
Op. 59 Marche funèbre variée.
Op. 60 Barcarolle.
Op. 61 Mélodies styriennes, Grande fantaisie.
Op. 62 Valse mélodique.
Op. 63 Grande fantaisie sur le Barbier de Séville, Opéra de Rossini.
Op. 64 Les capricieuses, Valses pour piano.
Op. 65 Tarantelle.
Op. 65 Souvenir de Pesth, Airs hongrois variés.
Op. 66 Introduction et Variations sur la Barcarolle de l’Opéra L’Elisire d’amore de Donizetti.
Op. 67 Grande Fantaisie sur des motifs de l’Opéra Don Pasquale de Donizetti.
Op. 68 La Fille du Régiment, Opéra de Donizetti, Fantaisie.
Op. 69 Trio pour piano, violon et violoncelle.
Op. 70 L´art du chant appliqué au piano.
Series I
[1] Quatuor de l´Opéra: I Puritani de Bellini.
[2] Tre giorni, Air de Pergolese.
[3] Adelaide de Beethoven.
[4] Air d´Église du célèbre chanteur Stradella.
[5] Lacrimosa tiré du Requiem de Mozart and Duo des Nocces de Figaro, Opéra de Mozart.
[6] Perchè mi guardi e piangi, Duetto de Zelmira, Opéra de Rossini.
Series II
[7] Bella adorata incognita, Romance de l'Opéra Il Giuramento de Mercadante.
[8] Choeur des conjurés de l'Opéra Il crociato de Meyerbeer.
[9] Einsam bin ich nicht alleine, de l´Opéra Preciosa de Weber.
[10] Le Meunier et le torrent tiré des Chansons de la Meunière de Fr. Schubert.
[11] Duet de l´Opéra Der Freischütz de Weber.
[12] Il mio tesoro, Air de l´Opéra Don Juan de Mozart.
Series III
[13] Sérénade de l´Opéra Le barbier de Seville de Rossini.
[14] La dove prende, de l´Opéra La flûte enchantée de Mozart.
[15] Barcarolle de l´Opéra Gianni di Calais de Donizetti.
[16] Trio et Duetto La ci darem la mano, de l´Opéra Don Juan de Mozart.
[17] Sérénade de l´Opéra L´amant jaloux de Grétry.
[18] Assisa a piè d´un salice, de l´Opéra Otello de Rossini.
Series IV
[19] Casta diva, Cavatine de Norma de Bellini.
[20] Mon coeur soupire, Air du Mariage de Figaro.
[21] Quatuor d´Euryanthe de Weber.
[22] David sur le rocher blanc, Ancien air de Barde du Pays de Galles.
[23] Chanson et Choeur de Jahreszeiten de Haydn.
[24] Fenesta vascia, Chanson napolitaine.
Op. 71 Florinda, Opéra de S. Thalberg, Six Transcriptions.
Op. 72 Home! Sweet Home!, Air anglais varié.
Op. 73 The last Rose of Summer, Air irlandais varié.
Op. 74 Souvenir d'Amerique, Lilly Dale, varié.
Op. 75 Pensées musicales, Les soirées de Pausilippe, Hommage à Rossini.
Op. 76 Célèbre Ballade.
Op. 77 Grande Fantaisie de Concert sur l’Opéra Il Trovatore de Verdi.
Op. 78 La Traviata, Fantaisie pour piano.
Op. 79 Trois mélodies de Franz Schubert transcrites, tirées de "Winterreise" et de "Schöne Müllerin"
[1] L'Illusion, ("Illusion").
[2] La curieuse, ("Die Neugierige").
[3] La poste, ("Die Post").
Op. 79 Romance dramatique.
Op. 80 La Napolitana.
Op. 81 Souvenir de Ballo in Mascera de Verdi, Fantaisie.
Op. 82 Rigoletto, Souvenir pour le piano.
Op. 83 (?) Air d’Amazily de Fernand Cortez de Spontini, Transcription.

Operas

Florinda, ou les Maures en Espagne, poem by Eugène Scribe, Italian libretto by Giannone, first performance July 3, 1851, Her Majesty's Theatre, London.
Cristina di Svezia, poem by Felice Romani, Italian libretto by Giannone, first performance June 3, 1855, Kärntnerthortheater, Vienna.

Works without opus numbers

Instrumental

Albumblatt, published in the Leipziger Allgemeine musikalische Zeitung of January 1, 1842.
Berceuse, piano.
Graziosa, Romance sans paroles.
Nocturne, ("Mozart Album").
Pastorale.
Romance variée pour le piano, Expressément composée par S. Thalberg pour être publiée avec les nouveaux signes de "La Réforme Musicale" d´Emmanuel Gambale Romance variée pour le piano.
Romance sans paroles, (2d "Keepsake des pianistes").
Le petit frère, Romance composée par F. Lablache et varié pour le piano par S. Thalberg.
Romance pour piano.
Scherzo from Mendelssohn's "Midsummer Night's Dream," transcribed for solo piano.
Mélodies anglaises
[1] Within the Convent Garden.
[2] Mid Stormy Winds.
[3] O Joyous Smile.
[4] One Alone hath the token.
[5] I wept amid my dreaming.
[6] Amid the greenwood smiling.
[7] The hour of rest.
[8] I've sign'd to the rose.
[9] With wirth the cottage.
Irish Airs for piano.
Scotch Airs for piano.
Octave study (from: Select Octave Exercises, various contributors).
Hexameron. Grandes variations de bravoure sur le marche des Puritains de Bellini, Liszt, Thalberg, Pixis, Herz, Czerny, and Chopin, 1st Variation: Thalberg
Un soupir, Mélodie variée, also called Viola, Mélodie.
Souvenirs d´Amérique, Valses brillantes, new version of Valse mélodique op.62.
Souvenirs de Venise, Romance-Étude pour piano.
Thalberg galoppe.
La vague, (see Op. 55: Le départ, Rromance en forme d´étude).
Auf Flügeln des Gesanges, Lied von F. Mendelssohn Bartholdy, Transcription.
Captain Jinks, variations for piano.
Lucrezia Borgia, Scène et Choeur du 2.e Acte, Transcription.
Duo sur Il trovatore de Verdi, piano duet, with Louis Moreaux Gottschalk.
Le fils du Corse, Mélodie par Auguste Morel, transcrite pour le piano.

Vocal

Les soirées aux Tuileries. Douze mélodies allemandes, voice and piano.
[1] Le départ de l´étudiant, "Doux berceaux de mon enfance".
[2] Le franc archer, "Que la foudre et la tempête".
[3] La fiancée trahie, "Hier encore la parjure".
[4] La faction du soudard, "J´entends galoper dans la prairie".
[5] Les vœux, "Le front couché sur la pierre".
[6] Franck, le garde de nuit, "L´horloge sonne quatre heures".
[7] Le départ du lansquenet, "Adieu, Kethy ma belle".
[8] La ronde du bandoulier, "Libre et fier sur mon coursier".
[9] Le fauconnier, "Voici la fraîche aurore".
[10] Le page, "Accueille mes vœux châtelaine".
[11] Le fossoyeur, "Oh combien l´homme oublie vite".
[12] La sérénade, "O toi, qu´en secret j´adore".
La partenza, melodia per canto con accompagnamento di pianoforte, text: Pietro Metastasio, the music forms the basis for Op. 55: Le départ, Romance en forme d´étude.
Zwei Gedichte
[1] Der Schiffer, "Es fahren die Schiffer".
[2] Letzter Besuch, "Ich hab' vor ihr gestanden".
Die Blonde, ("la bionda") von P. Clarens.
Larmes d´une jeune fille, Mélodie.
Mélodie du soir.
Nimmer, voice and piano.
Viola, Mélodie, also called Un soupir.
"When last we met thy face was fair", text by G. Macfarren, voice and piano.

Notes

External links
 Free scores of Thalberg's works
 Sigismund Thalberg International Study Centre 

Thalberg